The Tennessee Volunteers college football team competes as part of the NCAA Division I Football Bowl Subdivision (FBS), representing the University of Tennessee in the Eastern Division of the Southeastern Conference (SEC). Since the establishment of the team in 1891, Tennessee has appeared in 55 bowl games. Included in these games are 17 combined appearances in the traditional "big four" bowl games (the Rose, Sugar, Cotton and Orange) and two Bowl Championship Series (BCS) game appearances.

Through the history of the program, eight separate coaches have led the Volunteers to bowl games with Phillip Fulmer having the most appearances with 15. Fulmer also led Tennessee to the Bowl Alliance national championship game in the 1998 Orange Bowl and the first BCS national championship game in the 1999 Fiesta Bowl.

Key

Bowl games

Notes

References
General

Specific

Tennessee Volunteers

Tennessee Volunteers bowl games